WOSC may refer to:

 WOSC-CD, a low-power television station (channel 26, virtual 61) licensed to serve Pittsburgh, Pennsylvania, United States
 WKZP, a radio station (95.9 FM) licensed to serve West Ocean City, Maryland, United States, which held the call sign WOSC from 1994 to 2011